Giveon Dezmann Evans (born February 21, 1995), known mononymously as Giveon (stylized as GIVĒON), is an American singer. He rose to prominence with his collaboration with Drake on their 2020 single, "Chicago Freestyle". That same year, Giveon released the EPs, Take Time and When It's All Said and Done, the former being nominated for a Grammy Award for Best R&B Album, and the latter reaching the Top 10 on the US Top R&B Albums chart. He released "Heartbreak Anniversary", as the second single from Take Time, which reached the Top 40 in the US and was certified Platinum by RIAA. In 2021, Giveon was featured alongside Daniel Caesar on the Justin Bieber single "Peaches", which debuted at number one on the Billboard Global 200 and US Billboard Hot 100 charts. In 2022, he released his debut studio album Give or Take.

Early life 
Giveon Dezmann Evans was born on February 21, 1995, in Los Angeles County, California (likely in the city of Long Beach, California). He was one of three brothers raised by a single mother; he realized his passion for music at a young age, often singing at birthday parties. He credits his mother with pushing him to explore this early love for music and protecting him and his brothers from the pressures of gang culture and poverty. He attended Long Beach Polytechnic High School, and took a music education program at the Grammy Museum at age 18, where he fell in love with Frank Sinatra, whose bellowing voice was inspiring to the teenager. Growing up Giveon listened to R&B and soul and was also greatly inspired by Drake. Giveon fell in love with Barry White and Frank Sinatra's music through a Recording Academy program where kids got to learn about music history. Giveon was inspired by 1960s jazz and wanted to modernize what he heard.

Career

2018–2019: Career beginnings 
Giveon self-released his debut single "Garden Kisses" in August 2018. Shortly after, he was discovered by Canadian record producer Sevn Thomas, who found him on a random playlist on SoundCloud, and later signed him to his record label Not So Fast and Epic Records. Upon signing, he started to perform his original songs at different live venues, including "Like I Want You", before recording them professionally. In November 2019, he released the single "Like I Want You" shortly before serving as an opening act for Snoh Aalegra on her Ugh, A Mini Tour Again of Europe and North America.

2020–present: "Chicago Freestyle" and first EPs 
In 2019 Giveon toured with Snoh Aalegra where Giveon would often freestyle as he only had two songs out at the time. Giveon's manager sent his freestyle from Chicago to Drake. This led to their collaboration in "Chicago Freestyle", and this is how the single got its name. In February 2020, Evans was featured on Drake's single "Chicago Freestyle", which was only uploaded to SoundCloud and YouTube at the time. In March 2020, Evans released his debut EP, Take Time, which was executive produced by Thomas. The EP topped Billboard's Heatseekers Albums chart, earning Giveon his first charting project. Take Time also received acclaim from contemporary music critics who called it "breathtaking" and "polished". In May 2020, "Chicago Freestyle" was released for streaming, along with Drake's mixtape Dark Lane Demo Tapes. The song peaked at number 14 on the Billboard Hot 100, earning Giveon his first Billboard-charting single. It additionally became a top 40 single in the United Kingdom, Canada, New Zealand and Switzerland. In September 2020, Giveon announced the release of his four-track second EP When It's All Said and Done, and shortly released its lead single "Stuck on You". After being released on October 2, 2020, the EP debuted at number 93 on the Billboard 200. With a rapid increase of mainstream attention, Giveon's singles "Stuck on You" and "Like I Want You" began entering a number of Billboard R&B charts in late 2020, with the latter later being certified gold by the Recording Industry Association of America in December 2020. During this time, Giveon earned his first-ever Grammy Award nomination when Take Time was nominated for Best R&B Album at the 2021 Grammy Awards. He also made his debut television performance on Jimmy Kimmel Live!, performing "Stuck on You".

During the week of February 27, 2021, Giveon earned his second and third Billboard Hot 100 entries with "Heartbreak Anniversary" and "Like I Want You", entering the chart at numbers 74 and 95, respectively. On March 12, he released the compilation album, When It's All Said and Done... Take Time, a combination of his first two EPs, which included a new song titled "All to Me". Just a week later, he was featured on Justin Bieber's single "Peaches" from his album Justice.

On September 16, 2022, Epic Records revealed that Giveon recorded a track for the film Amsterdam called “Time,” co-written by Drake.

Artistry
Giveon is known for his baritone vocals. He is inspired by jazz music from the 1960s and 1970s. He cites Frank Sinatra, Frank Ocean, Drake, Adele and Sampha as some of his biggest influences.

Discography

Give or Take (2022)

Tours 
 Timeless Tour (2021) – Giveon's first tour, consisting of fourteen different shows spread throughout North America. One show was outside of the United States, in Toronto, Canada where Drake made an appearance.
 Give or Take Tour (2022) – Began on August 22, 2022 in Philadelphia, Pennsylvania and ended on October 21, 2022 in Toronto, Canada. The tour included North-American locations and Canadian locations in Montreal and Toronto. After the presale, Giveon added more tour dates, extending the tour by six shows.

Awards and nominations

References

External links 
 

1995 births
Living people
African-American male singer-songwriters
American contemporary R&B singers
American baritones
21st-century African-American male singers
Singers from Los Angeles
People from Long Beach, California
Singer-songwriters from California
Long Beach Polytechnic High School alumni